Hude is a municipality in the district of Oldenburg, in Lower Saxony, Germany. It is situated 15 km east of Oldenburg, and 25 km west of Bremen (centre). The population is approximately 15,000 and approximately one third of these people are retired.

Transport
Hude railway station

References

Oldenburg (district)